Venturi is a Monaco-based automotive manufacturer. Founded in 1984 by French engineers Claude Poiraud and Gérard Godfroy as MVS (Manufacture de Voitures de Sport). Venturi operated for nearly sixteen years, before declaring bankruptcy in 2000. The same year, Monegasque Gildo Pallanca Pastor purchased Venturi, and decided to focus on electric-powered motors.

The first team to commit to the Formula E World Championship, Venturi competes under the name of ROKiT Venturi Racing with its drivers Edoardo Mortara and Lucas di Grassi until 2022. Venturi has left the championship since then.

Venturi is now focused on the aerospace sector. Its main objective is the construction of a lunar rover.

History

From 1984 to 2000 

The first Venturi came out in 1984, created by Claude Poiraud and Gérard Godfroy, two former engineers at Heuliez. The goal was to present the only "Grand Tourisme" French car capable of competing with the English Aston Martin, the Italian Ferrari, and the German Porsche. The first car shown had a Volkswagen Golf GTi engine and the name was originally spelled "Ventury", with a "y" at the end. In 1985, the car was shown with a  Peugeot 505 Turbo engine, but by the 1986 Paris Motor Show it had reached its definitive form with the PRV V6 engine. Production began in 1987, with five cars built in the first year with production increasing in the subsequent years. The headquarters of the company was located in Couëron, Pays de Loire, where almost 750 cars were produced in the forthcoming 20 years.

From 1987 to the mid-1990s, they built mid-engined coupés and roadsters with turbocharged PRV engines and Renault gearboxes. The naturally aspirated Venturi 160 used the catalyzed 2849 cc version of the PRV V6; this was meant to be sold in Japan and was therefore also available with an automatic transmission. There was also the  Venturi 180, mainly developed for Italy, which used the turbocharged 1995-cc inline-four Douvrin engine from the Renault 21 Turbo.

Venturi was also briefly involved with the Larrousse Formula One team. The team's 1992 car, which bore the Venturi name, was designed and built by Venturi Larousse UK, a British company formerly known as Fomet 1, which had previously designed the 1991 Fondmetal Formula One cars.

The Venturi 400 GT remains one of the highest performing French cars ever produced, and was the first car in the world to have standard carbon brakes.

A limited-edition 400 GTR was built to satisfy the homologation requirements to compete 24 Hours of Le Mans. High-level competition has also brought fame to the brand. Stéphane Ratel, who would later found the FIA GT Championship, was at the origin of the Venturi Gentlemen Drivers Trophy. A total of 72 cars were manufactured and the customers were offered the possibility of converting the cars to road specification at the end of the season. These cars were driven by a total of 75 drivers. Venturi also won fame through its brilliant performances in the 24 Hours of Le Mans, particularly in 1993 with Christophe Dechavanne and Jacques Laffite with the Venturi Jaccadi team, and in 1995 with Paul Belmondo racing on the 600 SLM.

However, it was in the BPR Global GT Series races that Venturi established its pedigree defeating Porsche and Ferrari on several occasions. In 1994 in Dijon-Prenois, with Ferté and Neugarten on the 600 LM Jaccadi, at the 1000 km of Paris with Henri Pescarolo and Jean-Claude Basso on the 600 LM, and finally at the 4 Hours Spa race, once again with Michel Ferté and Michel Neugarten.

From 2000 to the present day 

In 2000, Gildo Pallanca Pastor bought Venturi and decided to focus on electric-powered engines. This led to the creation of the Fétish model.

In December 2009, Venturi announced its acquisition of French motorcycle manufacturer Voxan, allowing the firm to enter the motorcycle market.

Mission 01: Jamais contente 

Mission 01: Jamais Contente is a program launched in 2009 in partnership with the Ohio State University's Center for Automotive Research (CAR). It aims to set electric vehicle speed records on the Bonneville Salt Flats in Utah. The Venturi Buckeye Bullet is the heir to the Jamais Contente, the first ever automobile to break the symbolic 100 km/h mark in 1899. This torpedo-shaped electric car, piloted by Camille Jenatzy, reached 105 km/h, setting a world record for any method of propulsion (steam or petrol)

The VBB-2, a hydrogen fuel cell-powered version, broke the  mark in 2009. Finally, in 2016, the VBB-3 – the most advanced electric version of the vehicle with 2,200 kW (3,000 HP) of power – set a new FIA-certified world record of  that still stands today.

Mission 02: Shanghai to Paris 
Mission 02 is an electric car journey reminiscent of Citroën’s Croisière Jaune (Yellow Expedition), one of the first rally raids of the 20th century. Departing from Shanghai on May 3, 2010, the expedition covered 14,900 km, crossing China, Kazakhstan, Russia, Ukraine, Poland, the Czech Republic and Germany, finally arriving in Paris on July 13. To date, this is the longest distance covered by an unassisted electric vehicle. This performance was accomplished by Xavier Chevrin and Géraldine Gabin. The vehicle used was an electric Citroën Berlingo "Powered by Venturi". Two battery packs were added in order to increase its range to 500 km.

Mission 03: Back To Telegraph Creek 

Venturi has completed its own zero-emissions version of Citroën's historic Croisière Blanche expedition (also called the Bedeaux expedition), a 20th-century automobile raid that entailed crossing the Canadian North-West. That historic expedition ended in failure, owing to the nature of the terrain and the disastrous climatic conditions.

On 6 March 2019 in British Columbia (Canada), the Venturi Antarctica travelled 42 km in extreme temperatures as low as -30 °C. The aim of the expedition was to put the machine through a battery of tests in climatic conditions similar to those at the South Pole.

In June 2021, Venturi unveiled the next generation Antarctica which will be deployed at Princess Elisabeth Antarctic research station in December. The vehicle is 3.4 meters long, 2.18 meters high and weighs 2.5 tons. The battery has a capacity of 52.6 kWh allowing an autonomy of 50 kilometers, while the two axial flow motors are capable of developing 60 kW each. Recharging takes from 2 to 18 hours, depending on the context and the weather. With its fold-down bench seat, the vehicle is able to carry up to six people, along with equipment and a second battery to extend the initial range of 50 km.

Mission 04: Kilimanjaro to Okavango 
Mission 04 is a modern-day version of the “” (Black Cruise), a 1924 automobile expedition that crossed the African continent from north to south.

Mission 05: Salar de Uyuni 

The Voxan Wattman set a new world speed record for an electric motorcycle in the 'partially streamlined electric motorcycle over 300 kilos' class. Driven by Max Biaggi, the bike reached 366.94 km/h on the runway of Châteauroux-Centre airport in France. The Wattman holds 11 world speed records:

– ¼ mile, flying start, partially streamlined:          – no previous record

– ¼ mile, flying start, non-streamlined:                – no previous record

– 1 km, flying start, partially streamlined:       – previous record: 

– 1 mile, flying start, partially streamlined:          – previous record: 329,
 subsequently (2021) bettered by Biaggi on a Wattman at Kennedy Space Center - 

– 1 mile, flying start, non-streamlined:                – previous: record 
Max Biaggi on the Voxan Wattman (non-streamlined)

– ¼ mile, standing start, non-streamlined:              – no previous record

– ¼ mile, standing start, partially streamlined:        – previous record: 

– 1 km, standing start, non-streamlined:           – no previous record

– 1 km, standing start, partially streamlined:    – previous record: 

– 1 mile, standing start, non-streamlined:              – no previous record

– 1 mile, standing start, partially streamlined:        – no previous record

Motorsport

Formula E 
Venturi was the first manufacturer to join the Formula E world championship. Created in 2013, Venturi has been present on the grid since the championship's inaugural race in 2014.

In 2015, Venturi became an FIA-approved manufacturer in Formula E, supplying full powertrain systems to Dragon Racing (2015-2016) and Mercedes-backed privateer team HWA Racelab (2018-2019).

In May 2018, the team signed a three-year deal with eleven time Formula One race winner Felipe Massa and rehired seven time Macau World Cup winner Edoardo Mortara as teammate to Massa. Susie Wolff became the team principal in June 2018. At Formula E's landmark 50th race at the 2019 Hong Kong ePrix, Mortara recorded Venturi's maiden victory. Venturi took further podiums at the Mexico City E-Prix and Monaco E-Prix which was also the site of Massa's first podium finish in Formula E. With 88 points, the team took eighth in the championship. Mortara finished 14th in the Drivers’ Standings with 52 points while Massa was 15th with 36 points.

In October 2019, Venturi confirmed that Mortara would again partner Massa while the team entered a powertrain partnership with Mercedes-Benz. On the eve of the 2019-20 season opener, the team announced a three-year Title Partnership with global telecommunications company ROKiT, and also confirmed the retention of Norman Nato as Reserve Driver and the appointment of Arthur Leclerc, brother of Ferrari Formula One driver Charles Leclerc, as Test Driver. Mortara took 14th in the Drivers' Championship with 41 points while Massa was 22nd with 3 points. Venturi finished in 10th in the Teams' Standings with 44 points. At the final race of the season, it was announced that Massa would be retiring from Formula E.

For Formula E's seventh season and first as a World Championship, Venturi re-signed Mortara and promoted Norman Nato to a full-time race seat, with the Frenchman replacing Massa. Jake Hughes, in turn, joined the team as Reserve Driver. Jérôme d'Ambrosio was appointed as Deputy Team Principal after deciding to retire from professional competition at the end of Season 6.

In December 2020, Venturi announced a take over in ownership, with a US investor group led by Scott Swid and Jose M Aznar Botella purchasing the team. Susie Wolff remained as Team Principal and retained an interest in Venturi alongside Founder Gildo Pallanca Pastor. 

At the end of 2021-2022 season, Venturi left the championship.

Complete Formula One results
(key) (results in bold indicate pole position)

List of models 

MVS Venturi (includes Coupé and Cabriolet versions)1987-1990 – Coupé 160 automatic, Transcup, Transcup automatic (six built)
1987-1990 – Coupé 200, Transcup
1991 – Coupé 210, Transcup
1992 –Coupè 111 Cup (2-liter, four-cylinder export model, mainly for Italy)
1989-1996 – Coupé 260, Transcup (sold as the MVS 2.80 in 1989)
1991 – 260 Atlantique
1994-1996 – 260 LM
Trophy - 73 built for racing, ten later converted for street use by the factory
1994-1997 – 400 GT (15 built, 13 series 1 and two series 2)
Venturi Atlantique (rework of the MVS Venturi)
1996-1998 – Atlantique 300
1999-2000 – Atlantique 300 Biturbo
1999 – Venturi 300 GTR

 500 LM - a limited number (~7) were produced and raced at Le Mans, Jarama and Zolder in 1993
 600 LM - further racing cars were produced later in 1993 with the newer engine
 600 SLM - single example built in 1995, but other cars (originally 600 LM models) have been modified to similar specifications. Appeared at Suzuka, Japan, and Zhuhaï, China.

Electric cars 

Fétish, marketed as the first electric sports car in the world
 GT3 'Heritage', 2006
Eclectic, marketed as the first autonomous urban vehicle in the world
Astrolab, marketed as the first electric-solar hybrid vehicle in the world
Volage (electric concept roadster car with 8 Active Wheel in-wheel motors from French tire giant Michelin) 
Eclectic 2.0, a more compact of the Eclectic
 Venturi Buckeye Bullet series of speed-record vehicles, in conjunction with a team Ohio State University
Fétish II, the next generation of the Fétish
America, electric crossover, announced at the Paris Motor Show 2010

References

External links

Officials 
Brand Website
 Designer Website
 Owners club Website

Sports car manufacturers
Car manufacturers of Monaco
Vehicle manufacturing companies established in 1984
Solar car racing
Electric vehicle manufacturers of Monaco
Brands of Monaco
Privately held companies
Luxury motor vehicle manufacturers
Car brands